Spasalus crenatus is a beetle of the Family Passalidae.

Passalidae
Beetles described in 1819